Błażej Radler  (born 2 August  1982 in Rydułtowy) is a Polish former professional footballer who played as a defender.

Career

Club
Previously he played for Górnik Zabrze in the Polish Ekstraklasa.

In February 2011, he joined Pogoń Szczecin one and a half contract.

National team
He was a member of the Poland national under-18 football team which won the U-18 European Championship in 2001.

References

External links
 

1982 births
Living people
Polish footballers
Górnik Zabrze players
Odra Wodzisław Śląski players
Podbeskidzie Bielsko-Biała players
Znicz Pruszków players
A.F.C. Tubize players
Pogoń Szczecin players
Chojniczanka Chojnice players
Raków Częstochowa players
Ekstraklasa players
I liga players
II liga players
III liga players
Belgian Pro League players
People from Rydułtowy
Polish people of German descent
Polish expatriate footballers
Expatriate footballers in Belgium
Sportspeople from Silesian Voivodeship
Poland youth international footballers
Association football defenders